Belleek Pottery Ltd is a porcelain company that began trading in 1884 as the Belleek Pottery Works Company Ltd in Belleek, County Fermanagh, in what was to become Northern Ireland. The factory is produces Parian ware that is characterised by its thinness, slightly iridescent surface and body formulated with a significant proportion of frit.

History 

Pottery in the Belleek region began around 1849, after John Caldwell Bloomfield inherited his father's estate. Seeking to provide employment for his tenants, who had been affected by the Great Famine, and being an amateur mineralogist, he ordered a geological survey of his land. On finding that the area was rich in minerals, Bloomfield went into partnership with London architect Robert Williams Armstrong and Dublin merchant David McBirney. In setting up a pottery business, Bloomfield managed to get a railway line built to Belleek so that coal could be delivered with which to fire kilns.
Building started on the pottery in 1858. Initially starting with domestic products, it wasn't until 1863 that small amounts of the Parian ware for which Belleek is famous for to this day, was successfully produced. By 1865, the prestige of the company had increased enough that its market included Australia, Canada, England, Ireland, and the United States, and customers included the Prince of Wales, Queen Victoria and the nobility.

The artist and poet Eugene Sheerin worked at Belleek Pottery in the late 19th century. A Belleek dish with a reproduction of his painting "Innocence" (1879) is on display at the Royal Victoria & Albert museum London.

Acquisitions 

The original owners had all died by 1884, and a local group of investors acquired the concern and named it Belleek Pottery Works Company Ltd. Master craftsmen Frederick Slater moved from England to Belleek in 1893 and by 1920 high quality porcelain was becoming the mainstay of the business. The company struggled throughout the First and Second World Wars, and the company concentrated on producing earthenware during these periods.

After the Second World War, Belleek Pottery stopped production of earthenware. The Pottery began the change from coal fired kilns to electric powered kilns from 1952. In 1983 the Industrial Development Board gave financial assistance to the company and installed Roger Troughton as the Managing Director. The following year Troughton made a successful bid for the sale of the company. In 1988, Dungannon-based Powerscreen International bought the company, and opened a visitor centre the following year.

Today 
The company changed ownership again in 1990. Dundalk-born US-based George G. Moore remains the owner, though the company is run locally by four directors. Since then Belleek Pottery has expanded its factory space, acquisitions of other companies, staff and turnover. Subsidiary companies now include Galway Crystal, Aynsley China and Donegal Parian China. It employs more than six hundred people and has an annual turnover of around £30 million.

According to their own website, annual production is more than 100,000 pieces.

References

External links 

 www.belleek.com – Official Belleek Pottery website
 Discover Northern Ireland: Belleek Pottery Visitor Centre
 Works by Belleck Pottery in the collection of the Museum of New Zealand Te Papa Tongarewa

Ceramics manufacturers of Northern Ireland
Pottery in Northern Ireland
County Fermanagh
British companies established in 1857
Manufacturing companies established in 1857
1857 establishments in Ireland
Industry museums in Northern Ireland
Ceramics museums in the United Kingdom
Museums in County Fermanagh
Tourist attractions in County Fermanagh
Brands of Northern Ireland